Frank Edwin Carswell Jr. (May 1, 1921 - December 25, 1994) was a Negro league baseball pitcher. He played for the Cleveland Buckeyes between 1945 and 1948.

Carswell was the winning pitcher for the Buckeyes in the decisive Game 4 of the 1945 Negro World Series. He pitched a complete game shutout while allowing just four hits with three walks and a strikeout to outduel Ray Brown (a future member of the National Baseball Hall of Fame and Museum) and lead Cleveland to a sweep of the two-time defending champion Homestead Grays and win their first and only championship.

References

External links
 and Seamheads

1921 births
1994 deaths
Cleveland Buckeyes players
Baseball players from Georgia (U.S. state)
Baseball pitchers
Sportspeople from Macon, Georgia
20th-century African-American sportspeople